Hugh MacDonald (2 February 1699 – 12 March 1773) was a Roman Catholic bishop who served as the Vicar Apostolic of the Highland District of Scotland from 1731 to 1773.

Born in Morar, Inverness on 2 February 1699, he was the son of Alexander MacDonald of Morar and Mary, daughter of Ranald MacDonald of Kinlochmoidart. He was educated for the priesthood at the Seminary of Scalan, and afterwards at Paris. After completing his studies, he was ordained a priest by Bishop James Gordon on 18 September 1725. He was appointed the Vicar Apostolic of the Highland District and Titular Bishop of Diana by the Holy See on 12 February 1731. He was consecrated to the Episcopate on 18 October 1731. The principal consecrator was Bishop James Gordon, and the principal co-consecrator was Bishop John Wallace, assisted by Bishop Alexander Smith.

Like many others, he disapproved of the attempt of the Jacobite Rising of 1745 as inopportune; nevertheless, he became involved in the rising, and blessed the standard raised at Glenfman. After the disaster of Culloden, he remained in hiding on an islet in Loch Morar, where he had for a while as companion in misfortune Simon Fraser, 11th Lord Lovat. When Lovat was captured, the Bishop took refuge in the neighbouring woods until he found an opportunity of escaping to France by one of the ships that came in search of Prince Charles Edward Stuart. While in France he obtained a pension under the name of Marolle. He returned to Scotland in 1749. In 1755 he was apprehended in Edinburgh for his share in the '45, and, in the following year, he was tried and sentenced to perpetual banishment. The sentence, however, was never enforced, and, though the Bishop was obliged to live outside his district, he contrived to visit his district occasionally to perform episcopal duties, such as the setting up of Buorblach Seminary.

He died in Glengarry on 12 March 1773, aged 74.

References

1699 births
1773 deaths
Apostolic vicars of Scotland
People from Inverness
18th-century Roman Catholic bishops in Scotland